Nico Nyemba is a Zimbabwe international rugby union player. He played at Hooker but could also play at Prop.

Rugby Union career

Amateur career

Nyemba played for Hillhead Jordanhill in Scotland.

He then moved to play for Glasgow Hawks.

He signed for Blaydon from the Hawks in 2012.

He played for Harrogate.

Nyemba then played for Ilkley.

Nyemba now plays for Macclesfield.

Professional career

Nyemba came through the U16 age grade for Glasgow Warriors.

He played for Glasgow Warriors once in a friendly match against Scotland U20s in the 2006-07 season.

International career

Nyemba was capped for Zimbabwe. He received his first cap for Zimbabwe in 2015 playing against Tunisia in the African Nations Cup.

Rugby League career

Amateur career

Nyemba played for Carluke Tigers.

Outside of rugby

Nyemba works as a Physiotherapist in the NHS.

References

External links
History of Glasgow Hawks
Glasgow Pathway match at Cartha
Nico Nyemba You Tube highlights

Rugby union hookers
Living people
Glasgow Warriors players
Hillhead Jordanhill players
Glasgow Hawks players
Zimbabwe international rugby union players
Zimbabwean rugby union players
Blaydon RFC players
1988 births